This is an incomplete list of species in the fungal genus Puccinia. Members of this genus are pathogens on all major cereal crop species except rice, and some cause large economic losses. According to the Dictionary of the Fungi (10th edition, 2008), the widespread genus contains about 4000 species.

Puccinia abrotani
Puccinia abrupta
Puccinia acetosae
Puccinia achilleae
Puccinia adjuncta
Puccinia adoxae
Puccinia aegopodii
Puccinia agrophila
Puccinia akiraho
Puccinia albescens
Puccinia alboclava
Puccinia albulensis
Puccinia aletridis
Puccinia allii
Puccinia amphigena
Puccinia andropogonis
Puccinia anemones-virginianae
Puccinia angelicae
Puccinia angustata
Puccinia anisotomes
Puccinia annularis
Puccinia antenori
Puccinia anthemidis
Puccinia antirrhini
Puccinia apii
Puccinia arachidis
Puccinia arenariae
Puccinia areolata
Puccinia argentata
Puccinia aristidae
Puccinia aristolochiae
Puccinia arnaudensis
Puccinia aromatica
Puccinia artemisiae-chamaemelifoliae
Puccinia artemisiicola
Puccinia arundinellae
Puccinia asarina
Puccinia asparagi
Puccinia asperulae-cynanchicae
Puccinia asphodeli
Puccinia asterum
Puccinia atkinsonii
Puccinia aucta
Puccinia austrina
Puccinia barkhausiae-rhoeadifoliae
Puccinia batatas
Puccinia behenis
Puccinia belamcandae
Puccinia betonicae
Puccinia bistortae
Puccinia blechni
Puccinia bonariensis
Puccinia brachypodii
Puccinia bulbocastani
Puccinia bupleuri
Puccinia burchardiae
Puccinia butleri
Puccinia buxi
Puccinia cacabata
Puccinia calcitrapae
Puccinia calosperma
Puccinia calthae
Puccinia calthicola
Puccinia cameliae
Puccinia campanulae
Puccinia canaliculata
Puccinia canariensis
Puccinia cancellata
Puccinia cannae
Puccinia caricina
Puccinia caricis-araliae
Puccinia caricis-shepherdiae
Puccinia carthami
Puccinia caulicola
Puccinia celmisiae
Puccinia cephalandrae-indicae
Puccinia chaerophylli
Puccinia chaetochloae
Puccinia chathamica
Puccinia chloridis
Puccinia chondrillina, biocontrol of Chondrilla juncea
Puccinia chrysanthemi
Puccinia chrysosplenii
Puccinia cicutae
Puccinia circaeae
Puccinia circumalpina
Puccinia citrina
Puccinia cladii
Puccinia clavata
Puccinia clintonii
Puccinia cnici
Puccinia cnici-oleracei
Puccinia coaetanea
Puccinia cockaynei
Puccinia cognata
Puccinia commelinae
Puccinia commelinae-benghalensis
Puccinia commutata
Puccinia conclusa
Puccinia congesta
Puccinia conii
Puccinia contegens
Puccinia convolvuli
Puccinia coprosmae
Puccinia coronata
Puccinia costina
Puccinia cousiniae
Puccinia crepidicola
Puccinia crepidis-asadbarensis
Puccinia crepidis
Puccinia crepidis-montanae
Puccinia cribrata
Puccinia crinitae
Puccinia cuniculi
Puccinia cyani
Puccinia cygnorum
Puccinia cynodontis
Puccinia deyeuxiae-scabrescentis
Puccinia dichondrae
Puccinia difformis
Puccinia dioicae
Puccinia distichlidis
Puccinia distincta
Puccinia distorta
Puccinia drabae
Puccinia dracunculina
Puccinia duthiei
Puccinia egmontensis
Puccinia elymi
Puccinia elytrariae
Puccinia emaculata
Puccinia embergeriae
Puccinia enceliae
Puccinia epilobii
Puccinia erianthi
Puccinia eriophori
Puccinia erythropus
Puccinia euphrasiana
Puccinia eutremae
Puccinia evadens
Puccinia extensicola
Puccinia falcariae
Puccinia fergussonii
Puccinia ferruginosa
Puccinia festucae
Puccinia flaccida
Puccinia flaveriae
Puccinia flavescens
Puccinia flourensiae
Puccinia fodiens
Puccinia foyana
Puccinia fragosoana
Puccinia freycinetiae
Puccinia gahniae
Puccinia galii-cruciatae
Puccinia galii-verni
Puccinia gei
Puccinia gei-parviflori
Puccinia gentianae
Puccinia geranii-pilosi
Puccinia gigantea
Puccinia gigantispora
Puccinia gladioli
Puccinia glechomatis
Puccinia glomerata
Puccinia gnaphaliicola
Puccinia grahamii
Puccinia graminis
Puccinia granulispora
Puccinia harknessii
Puccinia hectorensis
Puccinia hederaceae
Puccinia helianthi
Puccinia helianthi-mollis
Puccinia heliconiae
Puccinia hemerocallidis
Puccinia heraclei
Puccinia heterospora
Puccinia heucherae
Puccinia hordei
Puccinia horiana
Puccinia hydrocotyles
Puccinia hyssopi
Puccinia hysterium
Puccinia investita
Puccinia iridis
Puccinia junci
Puccinia juncophila
Puccinia jurineae
Puccinia kalchbrenneri
Puccinia kansensis
Puccinia keae
Puccinia kenmorensis
Puccinia kinseyi
Puccinia kirkii
Puccinia kochiae
Puccinia koherika
Puccinia komarovii
Puccinia kopoti
Puccinia kuehnii
Puccinia kusanoi
Puccinia lactucarum
Puccinia lagenophorae
Puccinia lapsanae
Puccinia lateripes
Puccinia liatridis
Puccinia libanotidis
Puccinia liberta
Puccinia ligustici
Puccinia liliacearum
Puccinia lithospermi
Puccinia ljulinica
Puccinia longicornis
Puccinia longissima
Puccinia ludwigii
Puccinia luzulae
Puccinia lycii
Puccinia lygodesmiae
Puccinia maculosa
Puccinia magnusiana
Puccinia major
Puccinia malvacearum
Puccinia mania
Puccinia mariae-wilsoniae
Puccinia mariana
Puccinia maurea
Puccinia melanocephala
Puccinia melanosora
Puccinia melicae
Puccinia menthae
Puccinia mesomajalis
Puccinia microsora
Puccinia microspora
Puccinia minussensis
Puccinia minuta
Puccinia miscanthi
Puccinia mogiphanis
Puccinia moliniae
Puccinia monoica
Puccinia montana
Puccinia montanensis
Puccinia morrisoni
Puccinia moschata
Puccinia muehlenbeckiae
Puccinia mulgedii
Puccinia myrsiphylli
Puccinia nakanishikii
Puccinia namua
Puccinia nemoralis
Puccinia nepalensis
Puccinia nevadensis
Puccinia nitida
Puccinia noccae
Puccinia novozelandica
Puccinia oahuensis
Puccinia obliqua
Puccinia obscura
Puccinia obtectella
Puccinia operta
Puccinia opizii
Puccinia opulenta
Puccinia orbicula
Puccinia oreoboli
Puccinia oxalidis
Puccinia oxyriae
Puccinia paludosa
Puccinia pampeana
Puccinia paspalina
Puccinia patruelis
Puccinia pattersoniae
Puccinia pazschkei
Puccinia pedatissima
Puccinia pelargonii-zonalis
Puccinia peristrophes
Puccinia perlaevis
Puccinia petasitis
Puccinia phlomidis
Puccinia phragmitis
Puccinia phyllostachydis
Puccinia physedrae
Puccinia physospermi
Puccinia pimpinellae
Puccinia pittieriana
Puccinia plagianthi
Puccinia poarum
Puccinia podophylli
Puccinia podospermi
Puccinia polemonii
Puccinia polliniae
Puccinia polygalae
Puccinia polygoni-amphibii
Puccinia polygonicola
Puccinia polypogonobia
Puccinia polysora
Puccinia pounamu
Puccinia pratensis
Puccinia primulae
Puccinia pritzeliana
Puccinia prostii
Puccinia psidii
Puccinia ptarmicae
Puccinia pulverulenta
Puccinia pulvinata
Puccinia punctata
Puccinia punctiformis
Puccinia purpurea
Puccinia pusilla
Puccinia pygmaea
Puccinia rara
Puccinia rautahi
Puccinia recondita
Puccinia reidii
Puccinia rhei-undulati
Puccinia rhodosensis
Puccinia ribesii-caricis
Puccinia ribis
Puccinia rigensis
Puccinia rimosa
Puccinia romagnoliana
Puccinia rottboelliae
Puccinia rubefaciens
Puccinia ruelliae
Puccinia rufescens
Puccinia rufipes
Puccinia rugulosa
Puccinia ruizensis
Puccinia rumicis-scutati
Puccinia saccardoi
Puccinia saniculae
Puccinia santolinae
Puccinia satyrii
Puccinia saxifragae
Puccinia saxifragae-ciliatae
Puccinia scandica
Puccinia schedonnardii
Puccinia schileana
Puccinia schoenus
Puccinia schroeteri
Puccinia scirpi
Puccinia scleriae
Puccinia scorzonerae
Puccinia septentrionalis
Puccinia sessilis
Puccinia sherardiana
Puccinia silphii
Puccinia smyrnii
Puccinia soldanellae
Puccinia sorghi
Puccinia sparganioides
Puccinia spegazzinii
Puccinia stachydis
Puccinia striiformis
Puccinia suaveolens
Puccinia subcircinata
Puccinia subnitens
Puccinia substriata
Puccinia swertiae
Puccinia tanaceti
Puccinia tararua
Puccinia tekapo
Puccinia tenuispora
Puccinia thalaspeos
Puccinia thaliae
Puccinia thesii
Puccinia thuemenii
Puccinia thwaitesii
Puccinia thymi
Puccinia tiritea
Puccinia tirolensis
Puccinia toa
Puccinia triticina
Puccinia tumida
Puccinia turgida
Puccinia tweediana
Puccinia uliginosa
Puccinia umbilici
Puccinia unciniarum
Puccinia urticae
Puccinia urticata
Puccinia ustalis
Puccinia variabilis
Puccinia verbesinae
Puccinia veronicae
Puccinia veronicae-longifoliae
Puccinia verruca
Puccinia vincae
Puccinia violae
Puccinia virgae-aureae
Puccinia virgata
Puccinia vittadiniae
Puccinia vossii
Puccinia wahlenbergiae
Puccinia wattiana
Puccinia whakatipu
Puccinia willemetiae
Puccinia windsoriae
Puccinia xanthii
Puccinia ziziphorae
Puccinia zoysiae

References

List
Puccinia species, List of